Douglas Maxwell Newcombe was an Australian amateur tennis player who competed in the 1930s and 1940s. He reached the quarterfinals of the Australian Championships in 1940 and won the junior singles in 1938. In 1946, he was runner-up in the men's doubles (partnering Len Schwartz).

Grand Slam finals

Doubles: 1 runner-up

References

External links
 

Australian male tennis players
Year of birth missing
Year of death missing
Place of birth missing
Grand Slam (tennis) champions in boys' singles
Australian Championships (tennis) junior champions